Chione, or Khione  (Χιόνη, from the Greek χιών chiōn, "snow") may refer to:

In Greek mythology
 Chione is the name of several figures in Greek mythology, including:
Chione (daughter of Boreas), mother of Eumolpus by Poseidon
Chione (daughter of Daedalion), mother of Philammon and Autolycus by Apollo and Hermes respectively
Chione (daughter of Callirrhoe), who was changed into a snow cloud
Chione (daughter of Arcturus), who was abducted by Boreas and bore him three sons
Chione, mother of Priapus by Dionysus
Chione, one of the Niobids

In biology
 Chione (plant), a plant genus in the family Rubiaceae
 Chione (bivalve), a mollusc genus of bivalves in the family Veneridae

In astronomy
 6261 Chione (1976 WC) is a Mars-crossing asteroid discovered on November 30, 1976 by Schuster, H.-E. at La Silla.

In popular culture
 Khione, daughter of Boreas, a character in the book The Lost Hero and The House of Hades by Rick Riordan